Hugh Ramsay (25 May 1877 – 5 March 1906) was an Australian artist.

Early life and education

Ramsay was born in Glasgow, Scotland, on 25 May 1877, the son of John Ramsay. He moved with his family to Melbourne in 1878. He was educated at Essendon Grammar School, and joined classes at the National Gallery of Victoria at age 16 under Lindsay Bernard Hall and became one of the most brilliant students ever trained there. He won several first prizes, and at the competition for the travelling scholarship held in 1899 was narrowly beaten by Max Meldrum, another student of unusual ability.

Career
Ramsay went to Europe in September 1900 and was fortunate in finding a kindred spirit, George Washington Lambert, on the same vessel - the SS Persic. Arriving at Paris, he entered Académie Colarossi and was soon recognised as a student of great potential. He sent five pictures to the 1902 exhibition of the Société Nationale des Beaux-Arts and four of these were accepted and hung together. No greater compliment could have been paid to a young student.

Another Australian student whose studio was in the same building, Ambrose McCarthy Patterson (supported by Nellie Melba, then at the height of her fame, whose sister was married to Patterson’s brother). Ramsay was introduced to Melba, who gave him a commission for a portrait and would no doubt have been able to help him in his career. Eventually Ramsay became seriously ill with tuberculosis and was advised to return to the warmer climate of Australia. He made a small preparatory paintings but was unable to complete the planned full length portrait of Melba. Before leaving Europe, he had exhibited four pictures at the British Colonial Art Exhibition held in London at the Royal Institute galleries.

Returning to Australia, in spite of failing health, Ramsay succeeded in doing some remarkable work including The Sisters (a portrait of his own sisters, 1904; Art Gallery of New South Wales, Sydney), Lady with a Fan (possibly his most famous painting), the portrait of David Scott Mitchell, and his own portrait, now in the National Gallery of Victoria, Melbourne. He gradually became weaker and died at “Clydebank” Buckley Street, Essendon on 5 March 1906 a few weeks before completing his twenty-ninth year. He was buried in St Kilda Cemetery.

Family
Hugh Ramsay was brother to surgeon John Ramsay and William Ramsay, founder of Kiwi boot polish. His nephew, James, co-founded with his wife Diana the James and Diana Ramsay Foundation, responsible for one of the biggest bequests every made to an art gallery in Australia and funding the Ramsay Art Prize at the Art Gallery of South Australia.

References

External links

Scottish emigrants to colonial Australia
1877 births
1906 deaths
20th-century Australian painters
20th-century Australian male artists
Académie Colarossi alumni
People educated at Penleigh and Essendon Grammar School
Australian male painters
Artists from Melbourne
National Gallery of Victoria Art School alumni